The Theosophy Society was founded by Helena Petrovna Blavatsky and others in 1875. The designation 'Adyar' is sometimes added to the name to make it clear that this is the Theosophical Society headquartered there, after the American section and some other lodges separated from it in 1895, under William Quan Judge. In 1882, its headquarters moved with Blavatsky and president Henry Steel Olcott from New York to Adyar, an area of Chennai, India.

The US National Section of this organization is called the Theosophical Society in America located in Wheaton, Illinois.

Founders 

H. P. Blavatsky, Henry Steel Olcott, William Quan Judge and others founded the Theosophical Society on 17 November 1875 in New York City. The American section split off with William Quan Judge as its leader. Henry Steel Olcott remained president until his death in 1907.

Aims and ideals 
 To form a nucleus of the Universal Brotherhood of Humanity, without distinction of race, creed, sex, caste or color.
 To encourage the study of Comparative Religion, Philosophy and Science.
 To investigate unexplained laws of Nature and the powers latent in man.

Monastic/Non-monastic 

The Theosophical Society is open to anybody who supports its three objects, regardless of belief, social custom or marriage status. Celibacy is neither encouraged nor discouraged, each member being free to decide his/her own way of life.

General philosophical outlook 
 Universal Brotherhood
 Belief in theory of Karma
 Belief in Reincarnation
 There exists a Consciousness (Logos), Universal and  Individual
 Immortality of Man

Spiritual discipline 

The practice of brotherhood regardless of race, creed, sex, color, or any other difference is recommended. Nothing is mandatory. Members are free to have any or no spiritual practice at all.

Administration 

The organization has a highly autonomous setup in that lodges and sections are fully autonomous. The President gets involved in National Section matters only when there is some dispute between them. Otherwise the President does not interfere in the matters of the sections or lodges. The President is nominated by the members of the General Council and then elected by members all over the world. The President holds office for seven-year period. The Vice-President acts on behalf of the President as necessary and assists him or her in various ways. The Secretary handles worldwide correspondence, maintains records including statistics of the worldwide membership of the Society, its Lodges and Sections, is responsible for producing an annual report, and is also the Secretary of the General Council and the Executive Committee of the Society. This Committee, which meets a number of times each year, implements the decisions of the General Council and makes financial and administrative decisions relating to the Society's Headquarters. The Treasurer is responsible for the finances of the Society and prepares an annual financial report.

Locally, members are organised in lodges. When a country has at least seven lodges, these can be gathered in a national section. Lodges and sections have a democratic organisation in which chairperson, secretary, treasurer and optional other officers are elected. Similarly, officers of the national sections are directly elected by the members of that section in a business meeting.

International Presidents 
Henry Steel Olcott (1875 to 1907).
Annie Besant (1907 to 1933).
George Arundale (1934 to 1945).
Curuppumullage Jinarajadasa (1946 to 1953).
Nilakanta Sri Ram (1953 to 1972).
John Coats (1972 to 1980).
Radha Burnier (1980 to 2013).
Tim Boyd (2014 to ...)

Activities

Religion & spirituality 
The Theosophical Society is organised in lodges and national sections.  These organise meetings for religious study and lectures.  Members individually practice any kind of meditation or other spiritual practice they choose.

Social field 
 The Olcott Education Society
 The Olcott Memorial School
 The Olcott Memorial High School
 The Theosophical Order of Service

Olcott Memorial High School provides free education, uniforms, books, and two daily meals to impoverished rural children in Chennai, Tamil Nadu, India.

Cultural field 
 Theosophical Publishing House

Besant Scout Camping Centre 
Dr. Arundale, Provincial Scout Commissioner and President of Theosophical Society after Dr. Besant, set aside 10 acres of wooded area in the Olcott Gardens (part of TS) and named it Besant Scout Camping Centre (BSCC) in memory of the founder. Young Scouts and Guides frequent this on weekend for camping for various skill development and competitions amongst themselves.

Relief activities 
When a Tsunami hit South India on 26 December 2004, it affected many of the people living near the Adyar-compound. The Theosophical Society, through the Theosophical Order of Service, helped the people survive both in the immediate aftermath and later. Similar activities were undertaken after the hurricane that destroyed much of New Orleans in 2005.

Province of its influence 
The influence of the Theosophical Society has been major, especially considering its small size. The new age movement reflected many of its main characteristics, especially holism and eclecticism. In Modern Art, the artists Kandinsky and Mondriaan were both influenced by theosophy.

Theosophical Society and Jiddu Krishnamurti 
The leadership of the Theosophical Society at Adyar was responsible for promoting young Jiddu Krishnamurti as the new "World Teacher" during the first few decades of the 20th century. Charles Webster Leadbeater, one of the Society's leaders at the time, had "discovered" fourteen-year-old Krishnamurti in 1909, and considered him the likely "vehicle" for the expected reappearance of the Maitreya. However, as a young man in 1929, Krishnamurti disavowed his expected "mission" and disassociated himself from the Theosophical Society and its doctrines and practices. Over the next six decades he pursued an independent course, becoming widely known as an original, influential thinker and speaker on philosophical and religious subjects.

Publications 

 Magazines
 Brahmavidya – Adyar Library Bulletin
 The Theosophist – English monthly Current Issue
 Adyar Newsletter – quarterly journal
 Wake Up India – quarterly journal
 The Theosophical Digest – quarterly journal
 Books
 The Key to Theosophy – H. P. Blavatsky
 An Outline of Theosophy – C. W. Leadbeater
 The Ancient Wisdom – Annie Besant
 At the Feet of the Master – Alcyone
 First Principles of Theosophy – C. Jinarajadasa
 Light on the Path – Mabel Collins
 Seven Great Religions – Annie Besant
 Quest Books is the imprint of the Theosophical Publishing House, the publishing arm of the Theosophical Society in America (Wheaton, IL) branch of the International Theosophical Society  Adyar.
 Internet maillist – theos-talk – at www.groups.yahoo.com. A very active and independent maillist which has no official connection with any organization; it is a valuable source for up-to-date information on all matters relating to theosophy and TS Adyar and others. The archives are also public.
 Internet Community – www.theosophy.net A new public community website set up by a few interested theosophists. It is totally independent and is not funded or directly or indirectly controlled or moderated by any theosophy organization.

The garden

Known as the "Huddleston Gardens", the Theosophical Society garden lies on the south bank of the Adyar River and covers 260 acres. The garden has migratory birds, fruit bats, snakes, jackals, wild cats, mongooses, hares, and a variety of spiders. Trees include the rare mahogany and other trees from across the globe. The garden also has a 450-year-old banyan tree, which is known locally as Adyar aala maram, whose aerial roots cover some 60,000 sq m. The main trunk fell under its own weight in 1996.

See also 

 Survey of Hindu organisations
 Anthroposophy (Rudolf Steiner)
 J. Krishnamurti
 Theosophy
 Adyar Library
 Edmonton Theosophical Society
 Heritage structures in Chennai

Footnotes

References 
 Washington, Peter (1995)   Madame Blavatsky's Baboon: A History of the Mystics, Mediums, and Misfits Who Brought Spiritualism to America.,  Schocken; 1st American ed edition.   
 Theosophical chronology
 Influence of the Theosophical Society and Theosophists
 Ransom, Josephine (1938) A Short History of the Theosophical Society, Theosophical Publishing House, Adyar, 1938, 
 Besant Scout Camping Centre

External links 
 Theosophical Society - Adyar
 Theosophical Society in America
 European Federation of the Theosophical Society
 International Theosophical Centre, Naarden, The Netherlands
 Aikya - Theosophical Society in Greece - Good Discussions on current events in TS
 The Theosophical Society in Australia

Culture of Chennai
Religious organisations based in India
Theosophical Society
Religious organizations established in 1883
Spiritual organizations
Organisations based in Chennai
1883 establishments in India